As Sudah District  is a district of the 'Amran Governorate, Yemen. As of 2003, the district had a population of 32,169 inhabitants.

References 

Districts of 'Amran Governorate
As Sudah District